Monk-Punk is the debut studio album by the Finnish avant-garde progressive metal band Waltari.

Track listing

 "Good God" - 4:28
 "Rap Your Body Beat" - 3:55
 "Curiosity" - 5:41
 "Ride" - 3:28
 "Hello" - 2:39
 "Sad Song" - 5:04
 "Same Old Story" - 2:46
 "I Was Born In A Wrong Decade" - 2:58
 "Universal Song" - 4:21
 "Tired (F.U.C.K. Rap)" - 4:17
 "Help! (The Beatles cover)" - 1:36
 "Isolated" - 3:38
 "Hevosenkuva" - 2:44

Credits

Kärtsy Hatakka - Vocals, Bass, keyboards
Jariot Lehtinen - Guitar
Sami Yli-Sirniö - Guitar
Janne Parviainen - Drums

External links
Encyclopaedia Metallum page

Waltari albums
1991 albums